The 1972 United States presidential election in South Dakota took place on November 7, 1972, as part of the 1972 United States presidential election. Voters chose four representatives, or electors, to the Electoral College, who voted for president and vice president.

South Dakota was the home state of George McGovern, the Democratic Party nominee in the 1972 United States presidential election.

Although McGovern, a member of the liberal wing of his party in a relatively conservative state, was at the time of the election a popular two-term Senator, having won re-election in 1968 with 56.8% of the vote, he lost the presidential vote here to incumbent Republican President Richard Nixon. McGovern's loss was heavily influenced by voter opposition to his supposedly far-left ideology. Despite his loss in South Dakota, it was the only state that voted more Democratic in 1972 than it had in 1968. South Dakota was McGovern's fourth strongest state after Massachusetts, Rhode Island, and Minnesota.

McGovern's loss of South Dakota made him the second candidate in four years to lose his state of birth (in 1968 Hubert Humphrey also lost South Dakota, where he was born) and residence (also in 1968 Richard Nixon lost New York, where he then lived). McGovern remained the last candidate to lose his state of residence until 2000, when Al Gore lost Tennessee. Mitt Romney would also lose his then-home state of Massachusetts in 2012 to Barack Obama, and Donald Trump would lose his home state of New York in 2016, to Hillary Clinton (who also hailed from New York).

South Dakota weighed in in this election as nearly 15 points more Democratic than the nation at-large, a significant historical anomaly considering that the state normally leans very heavily Republican. In fact, this election marked one of only four times since statehood that South Dakota voted to the left of the nation, and the state is tied for the longest Republican streak in presidential elections.

Results

Results by county

See also
 United States presidential elections in South Dakota

Notes

References

1972
South Dakota
1972 South Dakota elections